Gregory S. Zuckerman (born September 7, 1966) is a special writer at The Wall Street Journal and a non-fiction author.

Education and family
Gregory Zuckerman grew up in Rhode Island and was graduated from Brandeis University, magna cum laude in 1988. He now lives in New Jersey with his wife and two sons. He works at the New York City bureau of The Wall Street Journal.

Career
Zuckerman started his journalism career as managing editor of Mergers and Acquisitions Report, a newsletter published by Investment Dealers' Digest. He left that position to write for the New York Post covering media companies. In 1996, Zuckerman joined The Wall Street Journal as a financial reporter.

At The Wall Street Journal, Zuckerman covered credit markets and wrote the widely read "Heard on the Street" column. Now, as a special reporter in the Money and Investing section, he covers financial trades, hedge funds, private equity firms, the energy revolution, and other investing and business topics.

Zuckerman appears regularly on CNBC, Fox Business, Yahoo Finance, Bloomberg Television, and various television networks. He makes regular appearances on National Public Radio, BBC, ABC Radio, Bloomberg Radio, and radio stations around the globe. He also gives speeches to business groups on a variety of topics. During one year, he spoke to groups in New York, Los Angeles, San Francisco, Houston, Dallas, Las Vegas, Phoenix, Calgary, Montreal, and Niagara Falls.

In October, 2021, he published A Shot to Save the World: The Inside Story of the Life-or-Death Race for a COVID-19 Vaccine that is about the development of an mRNA vaccine. On November 7, 2021, he was featured in an interview with the noted virologists of This Week in Virology, TWiV.

Awards and honors
Zuckerman is a three-time winner of the Gerald Loeb Award, the highest honor in business journalism. In 2015, he won the Gerald Loeb Award for Breaking News, for a series of stories revealing discord among Bill Gross, founder of bond powerhouse Pimco, and others at the firm, including Mohamed El-Erian. The stories precipitated Mr. Gross's surprise departure from Pimco.

In 2007, Zuckerman was part of a team that won the Gerald Loeb Award for Deadline Writing coverage of the collapse of hedge fund Amaranth Advisors. In 2003, he won the Gerald Loeb Award for Deadline Writing for coverage of the demise of telecom provider WorldCom. He was part of a team that won the New York Press Club Journalism award in 2008. He was a finalist for the 2008 Loeb award for coverage of the mortgage meltdown and a finalist for the 2011 Loeb award for investigative news coverage of the insider trading scandal.

He was part of a team that won the New York Press Club Journalism Award for investigative news coverage of the insider trading scandal in 2011.

Zuckerman broke the story about the trades by J. P. Morgan's London Whale in 2012.

He shared the 2015 Gerald Loeb Award for Breaking News for "Abdication of the 'Bond King'" with Kirsten Grind.

Books
The Greatest Trade Ever: The Behind-the-Scenes Story of How John Paulson Defied Wall Street and Made Financial History (2009)
The Frackers: The Outrageous Inside Story of the New Billionaire Wildcatters (2013), examines various individuals and independent companies who pioneered the fracking process within the United States. 
Rising Above: How 11 Athletes Overcame Challenges in their Youth to Become Stars (2016), was authored by Greg Zuckerman and his two sons; it is a book for young readers and adults that describes the remarkable stories of how various athletes overcame imposing setbacks in their youth. 
Rising Above: Inspiring Women in Sports (2018), was authored by Greg Zuckerman and his sons: it is a second book for young readers. 
The Man Who Solved the Market: How Jim Simons Launched the Quant Revolution (2019), the third non-fiction adult book authored by Greg Zuckerman is about Jim Simons of Renaissance Technologies. The Man Who Solved The Market was a New York Times and Wall Street Journal best seller. It was # 1 on the New York Times list of top-selling business books for the month of November, 2019, and was shortlisted in the FT/McKinsey competition for 2019 business book of the year.
A Shot to Save the World: The Inside Story of the Life-or-Death Race for a COVID-19 Vaccine (2021)

References

External links

1966 births
Living people
American male journalists
Writers from Rhode Island
Brandeis University alumni
Gerald Loeb Award winners for Deadline and Beat Reporting
Gerald Loeb Award winners for Breaking News
The Wall Street Journal people